Schistura nasifilis is a species of ray-finned fish, a stone loach, in the genus Schistura. This species was described from two rivers in Vietnam but has not been recorded since it was first described, although it was looked for in 2000 and 2002.

References

N
Fish described in 1936